Out of the Dust is a 1997 children's novel by Karen Hesse. The phrase may also refer to:
Out of the Dust, American Christian band
"Out of the Dust", a song by Phinehas from the album The Last Word Is Yours to Speak